Catlin Township is a township in Vermilion County, Illinois, USA.  As of the 2010 census, its population was 3,300 and it contained 1,342 housing units.

History
Catlin Township was created in 1858.

Geography

Demographics

Cities and towns
 Catlin

Extinct towns
 Bennett
 Charity
 Ryan

Adjacent townships
 Blount Township (north)
 Danville Township (east)
 Georgetown Township (southeast)
 Carroll Township (south)
 Jamaica Township (southwest)
 Vance Township (west)
 Oakwood Township (northwest)

Cemeteries
The township contains fourteen cemeteries: Allhands, Cox, Dougherty, God's Acre, Hickman, Jones Grove, Kight's, Mount Vernon, New Atherton, Oak Ridge, Pate, Songer, Spicer Family Plot and Wright Family.

Major highways
  Interstate 74
  U.S. Route 150

Airports and landing strips
 Cast Airport

Lakes
 Skyline Lake

School districts
 Salt Fork Community Unit School District 512
 Danville Community Consolidated School District 118
 Georgetown-Ridge Farm Consolidated Unit School District 4
 Oakwood Community Unit School District 76
 Westville Community Unit School District 2

Political districts
 Illinois' 15th congressional district
 State House District 104
 State Senate District 52

References
 U.S. Board on Geographic Names (GNIS)
 United States Census Bureau 2007 TIGER/Line Shapefiles

External links
 US-Counties.com
 City-Data.com
 Illinois State Archives

Townships in Vermilion County, Illinois
Townships in Illinois